Ström is a Swedish surname which may refer to:

People
Albin Ström  (1892–1962), Swedish socialist politician
Anders Ström, Swedish cross country skier who competed in the 1928 Winter Olympics
Carl Ström (1888–1957), Swedish film actor
Elma Ström (1822-1889), Swedish opera singer 
Eva Ström, Swedish lyricist, novelist, biographer and literary critic
Frank Ström, Swedish former handball player who competed in the 1972 Summer Olympics
Fredrik Ström  (1880–1948), Swedish Socialist politician and a prolific writer
Israel af Ström  (1778–1856), Swedish forest researcher and founder of Sweden's national Forestry Institute.
Karin Ström, Swedish singer and writer
Nikke Ström, Swedish rock musician
Oscar af Ström  (1867–1952), Swedish horse rider who competed in the 1912 Summer Olympics
Peter Ström, Swedish professional ice hockey right winger
Stefan Ström, Swedish retired boxer.

Other

Ström Vodka  - premium vodka, distilled by Shaman Spirits in Finland
Stockholms ström - also known as Strömmen, the innermost part of Saltsjön, a bay of the Baltic Sea
Motala ström - river system that drains Lake Vättern, the second largest lake in Sweden

See also
Strøm

Swedish-language surnames